Kunlaphon Yantrasri or formerly Sakchai Yantrasri. is a retired professional footballer from Thailand.

External links
Profile at Thaipremierleague.co.th

Living people
Kunlaphon Yantrasri
1977 births
Association football midfielders
Kunlaphon Yantrasri